Charles R. Spencer (generally called the Spencer) was a steamboat built in 1901 to run on the Willamette and Columbia rivers from Portland, to The Dalles, Oregon.  This vessel was described as an "elegant passenger boat".
After 1911 this vessel was rebuilt and renamed  Monarch.

Characteristics 

The Spencer was considered one of the elite vessels of its time.  It had a bright red smokestack and a steam whistle so loud that it was said to have "made rotten piles totter."

Operations 

E.W. Spencer operated Spencer as an independent enterprise.  Although steamboat racing was technically illegal, operators of steamboats often tried to "do their best" when a rival steamboat was on the river.  Spencer as a prestige boat was frequently raced against other top vessels of the day, including Bailey Gatzert and T.J. Potter.  Races against the Bailey Gatzert happened almost every day when the two vessels ran against each other on the Portland-The Dalles route.  It has been reported that at one time in 1906, when Spencer was running behind Bailey Gatzert, the captain of Spencer made up the time by running the Cascades Rapids (an extremely risky undertaking) while Bailey Gatzert was moving through the Cascade Locks .

On July 12, 1904, Spencer was racing the Oregon Railway and Navigation Company's Dalles City on the Columbia about 15 miles upstream from Hood River.  The winds were high, and blowing east against the steamers as they moved downstream, and the waves were choppy.  The Spencers main steam pipe broke, which forced the pilot to steer for the river bank to beach the vessel.  Spencer hit rocks 25 feet from shore, and sank.  There were no casualties among those aboard.  Spencer was later refloated and repaired.   In 1905, Captain Spencer continued to be in sharp competition for the passenger traffic on the routes from Portland to Astoria and to The Dalles.  His competitors included the Oregon Railway and Navigation Company, and also Captain U.B. Scott, owner of Telephone, possibly the fastest vessel on the river.

Collision with Dalles City 

On May 31, 1905, a collision during one of these races between Dalles City and the Spencer generated substantial litigation.  Dalles City was struck by the Charles R. Spencer while the Spencer was trying to overtake Dalles City.  As a result, Dalles City suffered serious and disabling mechanical damage.  The opinion of the court describes the fierce commercial competition which was the occasion for the race on that date:

In November 1905, the Spencer, Dalles City, and Telephone all cast off lines at once in Portland, and headed downriver for Astoria.  As each vessel raced down the Willamette at high speed, they threw up a wake which rocked and damaged large ships moored alongside piers, which resulted in the captains of the steamboats each being fined $50, a considerable sum for the time.

Freight work 
In September 1906, Spencer began transporting wheat from inland Oregon and Washington in cooperation with the Open River Navigation Company.  The boats of the Open River company would pick up the wheat on points on the river above Celilo, bring the wheat down to Celilo, where it would be loaded on the portage railway that ran along the river to a point above the Dalles, where the wheat would be loaded onto the Spencer to be brought down to tidewater at Portland, transiting the Cascade Locks en route.  Another source states that Spencer was taken over by the Open River company.

Later career 
The rising automobile business took away Spencer'''s main routes, and in 1911 the vessel was rebuilt and renamed Monarch.Spencer was transferred to California in 1914.  One of Spencer's early captains was Edgar E. Bateman (1856–1949).

Notes

 References 
 Affleck, Edward L., A Century of Paddlewheelers in the Pacific Northwest, the Yukon, and Alaska, Alexander Nicolls Press, Vancouver, BC 2000
 Marshall, Don, Oregon Shipwrecks, Binford and Mort, Portland 1984 
 Newell, Gordon R., H.W. McCurdy Marine History of the Pacific Northwest, Superior Publishing, Seattle WA 1966 
 Newell, Gordon R., and Williamson, Joe, Pacific Steamboats, Bonanza Books, New York, NY 1958
 Timmen, Fritz, Blow for the Landing -- A Hundred Years of Navigation on the Waters of the West, Caxton, Caldwell, Idaho, 1973 

Further reading

 Faber, Jim, Steamer's Wake, Enetai Press, Seattle, WA 1985 
 Mills, Randall V., Stern-wheelers up Columbia -- A Century of Steamboating in the Oregon Country'', University of Nebraska Press, Lincoln, NE (1947)

Steamboats of Oregon
Steamboats of California
Columbia River
Steamboats of the Columbia River
Ships built in Seattle
1901 ships
Passenger ships of the United States